Uranium-232 is an isotope of uranium. It has a half-life of around 
69 years and is a side product in the thorium cycle. It has been cited as an obstacle to nuclear proliferation using 233U as the fissile material, because the intense gamma radiation emitted by 208Tl (a daughter of 232U, produced relatively quickly) makes the 233U contaminated with it more difficult to handle.

Production of 233U (through the neutron irradiation of 232Th) invariably produces small amounts of 232U as an impurity, because of parasitic (n,2n) reactions on uranium-233 itself, or on protactinium-233, or on thorium-232:

232Th (n,γ) 233Th (β−) 233Pa (β−) 233U (n,2n) 232U
232Th (n,γ) 233Th (β−) 233Pa (n,2n) 232Pa (β−) 232U
232Th (n,2n) 231Th (β−) 231Pa (n,γ) 232Pa (β−) 232U

Another channel involves neutron capture reaction on small amounts of thorium-230, which is a tiny fraction of natural thorium present due to the decay of uranium-238:

230Th (n,γ) 231Th (β−) 231Pa (n,γ) 232Pa (β−) 232U

The decay chain of 232U quickly yields strong gamma radiation emitters:

232U (α, 68.9 years)
228Th (α, 1.9 year)
224Ra (α, 3.6 day, 0.24 MeV) (from this point onwards, the decay chain is identical to that of 232Th; thorium-232 is nevertheless much less dangerous because its extremely long half-life of about 14-15 billion years means that not as much of its dangerous daughters builds up)
220Rn (α, 55 s, 0.54 MeV)
216Po (α, 0.15 s)
212Pb (β−, 10.64 h)
212Bi (α, 61 min, 0.78 MeV)
208Tl (β−, 3 min, 2.6 MeV) (35.94% branching ratio)
208Pb (stable)

This makes manual handling in a glove box with only light shielding (as commonly done with plutonium) too hazardous, (except possibly in a short period immediately following chemical separation of the uranium from its decay products) and instead requiring remote manipulation for fuel fabrication.

Unusually for an isotope with even mass number, 232U has a significant neutron absorption cross section for fission (thermal neutrons , resonance integral ) as well as for neutron capture (thermal , resonance integral ).

References

Isotopes of uranium
Actinides
Nuclear materials